The Provisional Government of Albania was the first government of Albania, created by the Assembly of Vlorë on 4 December 1912. It was a paternal government, led by Ismail Qemali, until his resignation on 22 January 1914, followed by the International Control Commission until the proclamation of the Principality of Albania.

Qemali Government Cabinet

Notes

References

G1
Provisional governments
Modern history of Albania